Kiddington with Asterleigh is a civil parish in West Oxfordshire, England. It contains the small village of Kiddington, the hamlet of Over Kiddington and Asterleigh.

Civil parishes in Oxfordshire
West Oxfordshire District